{{DISPLAYTITLE:C4H9NO}}
The molecular formula C4H9NO (molar mass: 87.1 g/mol) may refer to:

 Butyramide
 Dimethylacetamide
 Isobutyramide
 2-Methyl-2-nitrosopropane
 Methylethyl ketone oxime
 Morpholine